Bingöl is a village in the Eruh District of Siirt Province in Turkey. The village is populated by Kurds of the Jilyan tribe and had a population of 12 in 2021.

History 
The village was part of the Chaldean Catholic Eparchy of Seert of the Chaldean Catholic Church and had a population of 110 Assyrians in 1913.

References 

Villages in Eruh District
Kurdish settlements in Siirt Province
Historic Assyrian communities in Turkey